A Mini-MBA is a training regimen focused on the fundamentals of business management. The program provides an introductory insight into business, preparing students as well as professionals for what might be a further exploration, or just a foundational understanding of the area. While it is named as "Mini-MBA", it is generally not considered as a version of MBA degree, with the exceptions of RWTH AACHEN Business School and Harvard GSAS where the “Mini MBA” is just a smaller version of the traditional MBA degree and does carry academic benefits.

Curriculum
Mini-MBA programs typically cover the content topics of traditional MBAs such as accounting, business communication, business ethics, finance, managerial economics, management, entrepreneurship, marketing, operations, and strategic management. In addition to the general Mini-MBA programs where the program covers general business concepts, some colleges offer Mini-MBA specializations in areas such as social media marketing, digital marketing and sustainable innovation.  The Harvard GSAS Mini MBA, (as it is a smaller version of HBS MBA) uses the “case-method” teaching which is very common at Harvard business courses.

List of programs
Several business schools, colleges, educational institutions and some companies offer online and offline Mini-MBA programs, including:

 Aachen RWTH Business School, Germany (in German)
 Académie Canadienne de Management et de Technologie, Canada
 Aros Business Academy, Denmark
 Bentley University, US
 Borsen, Denmark 
 European International University, France
 Belmont University, US
 Farmer School of Business (Miami University), US
 Harvard GSAS Business Club (Harvard University), US
 International Business Management Institute, Germany
 International Energy Training Centre, Lagos, Nigeria
 Invited MBA, US
 IEBS Business School, Spain
 Leaders Excellence at Harvard Square, US
 London School of Business & Finance, UK
 Opus College of Business (University of St. Thomas), US
 Management Centre Europe, Belgium
 McGill Executive Institute (McGill University), Canada
 Robins School of Business (University of Richmond), US
 Rutgers Business School (Rutgers University), US
 Schulich School of Business (York University), Canada
 University at Buffalo School of Management, US
 Yale Student Business Society (Yale University), US
 Your Excellency Limited, London, UK
 Zürich International Business School, Zürich, Switzerland

Today, many international companies also implement their own internal Mini-MBA programs to train their employees, such as McKinsey’s Mini-MBA for Young Professionals. and PwC’s Mini MBA.

References

Business qualifications